Demet Özdemir Koç (born 26 February 1992) is a Turkish actress and former dancer.

Personal life 
Demet Özdemir was born on 26 February 1992 as the youngest of three children. She moved to Istanbul with her mother and siblings after her parents' divorce, when she was seven years old.

Her grandmother was the one of Turkish minorities in Bulgaria. She immigrated from Bulgaria to Turkey. Her grandmother and her brother later immigrated to Germany. She died in October 2022 in Germany.

On 28 August 2022, she married musician and actor Oğuzhan Koç.

Dance career
Initially, she was a backup dancer for Bengü and later joined the dance group of Efes Kızları. Özdemir then appeared on Mustafa Sandal's music video "Ateş Et ve Unut".

Acting career
She had her first casting for Fox's fantasy series Sana Bir Sır Vereceğim alongside her first partner Ekin Koç, playing the character "Aylin" with electric power. This role became phenomenon for young audience. The series developed a loyal fanbase. Due to, The series was published before prime time. It wasn't known for adult audience. Later, she portrayed the character of "Ayla" on historical series Kurt Seyit ve Şura, and got a role as "Demet" in the movie Tut Sözünü. She then played the character of "Aslı" on Star TV's series Çilek Kokusu. Özdemir also appeared in Bengü's music video "Hodri Meydan".

In 2016, Özdemir played the lead role "Lale Yenilmez" in the Turkish romantic comedy series No 309. It ended on 25 October 2017 with 65 episodes. It was aired in Venezuela, Paraguay, Chile, Bolivia, Spain, Romania, and Hungary as well. She played in dance-comedy film "Sen Kiminle Dans Ediyorsun, written by Burak Aksak famous writer of hit surreal comedy Leyla ile Mecnun.

From 2018 to 2019, she played the lead role "Sanem" in the Turkish romantic comedy series Erkenci Kuş (Daydreamer) opposite Can Yaman. She received the Best Actress award at the 2019 Murex d'Or in Lebanon for her role in this series. Erkenci Kuş aired many times as prime-time in Italy and the actress was invited at the popular entertainment show Verissimo. Her interview was watched by over 3.5 million people.

In November 2019, she became a brand ambassador for Pantene Turkey.

Between 2019 and 2021, Özdemir played the lead role "Zeynep" in Doğduğun Ev Kaderindir (My Home, My Destiny). The series is produced by OGM Pictures, directed by Çağrı Bayrak and premiered on TV8 on 25 December 2019. The script is inspired by Gülseren Budayıcıoğlu's novel Camdaki Kız.

She then had a leading role in the Netflix movies Aşk Taktikleri and Aşk Taktikleri 2.

Filmography

References

External links 

 
 

1992 births
Golden Butterfly Award winners
Living people
Turkish female dancers
Turkish female models
Turkish film actresses
Turkish television actresses
People from İzmit